William M. Sage is an American lawyer, specializing in health and public law, currently the James R. Dougherty Chair for Faculty Excellence at University of Texas School of Law, University of Texas at Austin.

References

Year of birth missing (living people)
Living people
University of Texas at Austin faculty
American lawyers
Stanford Law School alumni
Stanford University School of Medicine alumni
Harvard University alumni